Proverbs 13 is the thirteenth chapter of the Book of Proverbs in the Hebrew Bible or the Old Testament of the Christian Bible. The book is a compilation of several wisdom literature collections, with the heading in 1:1 may be intended to regard Solomon as the traditional author of the whole book, but the dates of the individual collections are difficult to determine, and the book probably obtained its final shape in the post-exilic period. This chapter is a part of the second collection of the book.

Text
The original text is written in Hebrew language. This chapter is divided into 25 verses.

Textual witnesses
Some early manuscripts containing the text of this chapter in Hebrew are of the Masoretic Text, which includes the Aleppo Codex (10th century), and Codex Leningradensis (1008). Fragments containing parts of this chapter in Hebrew were found among the Dead Sea Scrolls including 4Q103 (4QProv; 30 BCE – 30 CE) with extant verses 6–9.

There is also a translation into Koine Greek known as the Septuagint, made in the last few centuries BC. Extant ancient manuscripts of the Septuagint version include Codex Vaticanus (B; B; 4th century), Codex Sinaiticus (S; BHK: S; 4th century), and Codex Alexandrinus (A; A; 5th century).

Analysis
This chapter belongs to a section regarded as the second collection in the book of Proverbs (comprising Proverbs 10:1–22:16), also called "The First 'Solomonic' Collection" (the second one in Proverbs 25:1–29:27). The collection contains 375 sayings, each of which consists of two parallel phrases, except for Proverbs 19:7 which consists of three parts.

Verse 1
A wise son hears his father's instruction,
but a scoffer does not listen to rebuke.
A few Medieval Hebrew manuscripts, read , yishmaʿ, to render the clause “a wise son listens to/obeys his father”, which is supported by the Greek Septuagint, and the Syriac versions.
This saying reinforces the parental appeals of chapters 1–9, with a warning that a refusal to heed correction ("rebuke") would place 'wisdom beyond reach' of the 'scoffer' (cf. Proverbs 9:7–8; 14:6; 15:12). verse 24 uses the word 'discipline' (Hebrew: mū-sār) in relation to physical chastisement.

Verse 24
He who spares his rod hates his son,
but he who loves him disciplines him early.
Proverbs 13.] Accessed 9 Juli 2019.</ref>
The word 'discipline' here is used in relation to 'physical chastisement' (cf. "instruction" in verse 1), which is viewed as essential for the upbringing of a child. The contrast between 'hate' and 'love' points to the importance of the wisdom attached to it (cf. Proverbs 20:30; 23:13–14).

See also

Related Bible parts: Proverbs 9, Proverbs 20, Proverbs 23

References

Sources

External links
 Jewish translations:
 Mishlei - Proverbs - Chapter 13 (Judaica Press) translation [with Rashi's commentary] at Chabad.org
 Christian translations:
 Online Bible at GospelHall.org (ESV, KJV, Darby, American Standard Version, Bible in Basic English)
 Book of Proverbs Chapter 13 King James Version
  Various versions

13